Dorothy Mary Emmet (29 September 1904, Kensington, London – 20 September 2000, Cambridge) was a British philosopher and head of Manchester University's philosophy department for over twenty years. With Margaret Masterman and Richard Braithwaite she was a founder member of the Epiphany Philosophers. She was the doctoral advisor of Alasdair MacIntyre and Robert Austin Markus. Emmet was educated at Lady Margaret Hall, University of Oxford, where she took first-class honours in 1927.

Positions held 
Commonwealth Fellowship at Radcliffe College
Tutor at Somerville College, Oxford
Lecturer in philosophy at Armstrong College, Newcastle-upon-Tyne (now Newcastle University) in 1932
She joined Manchester University as a lecturer in the philosophy of religion in 1938. She was named reader in philosophy in 1945 and was appointed Sir Samuel Hall professor of philosophy in 1946.
President of the Aristotelian Society in 1953–54.
Fellow, Lucy Cavendish College, University of Cambridge in 1966

Publications 
Whitehead's Philosophy of Organism (1932)
The Nature of Metaphysical Thinking (1945)
Annual philosophical lecture to the British Academy (1949)
The Stanton lectures in Cambridge (1950–53)
Function, Purpose and Powers (1958)
Rules, Roles and Relations (1966)
Sociological Theory and Philosophical Analysis (1970; co-edited with Alasdair MacIntyre).
The Moral Prism (1979)
The Effectiveness of Causes (1986)
The Passage of Nature (1992)
The Role of the Unrealisable (1994)
Philosophers and Friends: Reminiscences of 70 Years in Philosophy (1996)

References

Sources
 Obituary: Dorothy Emmet The Guardian, 27 September 2000
 Dorothy Emmet Times obituary, 8 October 2000 – archived by Wayback Machine
 James A. Bradley, André Cloots, Helmut Maaßen and Michel Weber (eds.), European Studies in Process Thought, Vol. I. In Memoriam Dorothy Emmet, Leuven, European Society for Process Thought, 2003.
 Leemon McHenry, "Dorothy M. Emmet (1904–2000)," in Michel Weber and Will Desmond (eds.). Handbook of Whiteheadian Process Thought (Frankfurt / Lancaster, Ontos Verlag, 2008, pp. 649 sq.). Cf. Ronny Desmet & Michel Weber (edited by), Whitehead. The Algebra of Metaphysics. Applied Process Metaphysics Summer Institute Memorandum, Louvain-la-Neuve, Les Éditions Chromatika, 2010.
Leemon McHenry, "EMMET, Dorothy Mary (1904–2000)" Dictionary of Twentieth-Century British Philosophers, edited by Stuart Brown, Bristol: Thoemmes Press, 2005, pp. 266–268.

1904 births
2000 deaths
Philosophers of religion
Metaphysicians
British women philosophers
Presidents of the Aristotelian Society
20th-century British philosophers
Fellows of Somerville College, Oxford